The Act of Proscription (19 Geo. 2, c. 39), also called the Act of Proscription 1746, was an Act of the Parliament of Great Britain, which came into effect in Scotland on 1 August 1746. It was part of a series of efforts to assimilate the Scottish Highlands, ending their ability to revolt, and the first of the "King's laws" that sought to crush the Clan system in the aftermath of the Jacobite rising of 1745. These laws were finally repealed on 1 July 1782.

Background

From 1745 to 1746, government forces led by the Duke of Cumberland gradually suppressed the Jacobite rising of 1745. As the majority of the Jacobite Army consisted of men from the Scottish Highlanders, the Hanoverian regime made plans to suppress the Highland clan system to prevent future rebellions.

Penalties
It was mainly a restatement of the earlier Disarming Act, but with more severe punishments which this time were rigorously enforced. Punishments started with fines, with jail until payment and possible forced conscription for late payment. Repeat offenders were "liable to be transported to any of his Majesty's plantations beyond the seas, there to remain for the space of seven years", effectively indentured servitude.

The penalties for wearing "highland clothing" as stated in the Dress Act 1746 were "imprisonment, without bail, during the space of six months, and no longer; and being convicted for a second offence before a court of justiciary or at the circuits, shall be liable to be transported..." No lesser penalties were allowed for.

Geographical Coverage
The elements of the act relating to the proscription of arms applied to the Highlands of Scotland, i.e. the counties of Dunbarton, on the north side of the water of Leven, Stirling on the north side of the river of Forth, Perth, Kincardine, Aberdeen, Inverness, Nairn, Cromarty, Argyll, Forfar, Banff, Sutherland, Caithness, Elgin and Ross.

The Dress Act applied to the whole of Scotland.

Comment
Dr. Samuel Johnson commented that "the last law by which the Highlanders are deprived of their arms, has operated with efficacy beyond expectations ... the arms were collected with such rigour, that every house was despoiled of its defence". They were also, of course, despoiled of the ability to hunt which, their cattle having been seized, meant starvation for many.

Sections of the Act
A new section, which became known as the Dress Act, banned wearing of "the Highland Dress". Provision was also included to protect those involved in putting down the rebellion from lawsuits. Measures to prevent children from being "educated in disaffected or rebellious principles" included a requirement for school prayers for the King and Royal family.

The most severe penalties, at a minimum six months' incarceration and transportation to a penal colony for a second offence, made these the most severe portion of this act.

Following Act
The Act of Proscription was followed by the Heritable Jurisdictions (Scotland) Act 1746 which removed the feudal authority the Clan Chieftains had enjoyed. Scottish heritable sheriffdoms reverted to the Crown, and other heritable jurisdictions, including regalities, came under the power of the courts.

References

External links
Act of Proscription 1747
Act against the Highland Dress
Acts against the Highland Dress

History of the Scottish Highlands
Acts of the Parliament of Great Britain concerning Scotland
Great Britain Acts of Parliament 1746
Repealed Great Britain Acts of Parliament
Jacobite rising of 1745
1746 in Scotland
Firearm laws
Gun politics in the United Kingdom

de:Disarming Act